Max Anderson (born 17 May 2001) is a Scottish professional footballer who plays as a midfielder for Dundee.

Career 
After spending his youth career with Dundee, Anderson signed his first professional contract with the club in April 2019. Anderson would make his professional debut with Dundee in the Scottish Challenge Cup in September 2019, coming off the bench in a loss to Elgin City.

In October 2020, Anderson signed a new contract with Dundee to keep him at the club until 2023. After impressing in friendlies and the Scottish League Cup, Anderson made his league debut for The Dark Blues in an away loss to Heart of Midlothian, and would compete for regular starts after impressing in his games. In March 2021, Anderson would score his first goal for Dundee in a 2–1 home win against Inverness Caledonian Thistle. At the end of the league season, Anderson was awarded Dundee's Isobel Sneddon Young Player of the Year award. Anderson would be a part of the Dundee team which won the Premiership play-offs and gained promotion to the Scottish Premiership.

Anderson notched his first Premiership goal for the club in a 0–1 away win against St Mirren, and would win Man of the Match for his performance. Despite Dundee being relegated, Anderson's consistent and impressive play resulted in him being awarded the Isobel Sneddon Young Player of the Year award for the second successive season.

International career 
In August 2021, Anderson received a call-up for the Scotland national under-21 football team for the UEFA European Under-21 Championship qualifier against Turkey. He would make his international debut in this fixture as a substitute.

Career statistics

Honours 
Individual

Dundee F.C.

 Isobel Sneddon Young Player of the Year (2): 2020–21, 2021–22

References 

2001 births
Living people
Scottish footballers
Association football midfielders
Dundee F.C. players
Scottish Professional Football League players
Scotland under-21 international footballers